William Shepperd Ashe (August 12, 1813September 14, 1862) was a Democratic U.S. Representative from North Carolina between 1849 and 1855.

Biography
Born in Rocky Point, North Carolina in 1813, Ashe attended school in Fayetteville and pursued classical studies at Trinity College in Hartford, Connecticut. Ashe engaged in rice cultivation and studied law; he was admitted to the state bar in 1836 and practiced in New Hanover County.

Active in the Democratic Party, Ashe was a presidential elector in 1844 and was elected to the North Carolina Senate for a term of two years (1846–1848). In 1848, he was sent to the U.S. House, serving in the 31st, 32nd, and 33rd Congresses (March 4, 1849 – March 3, 1855). During the 32nd Congress, Ashe chaired the Committee on Elections. He did not run again in 1854 but served as the president of the Wilmington and Weldon Railroad Company from 1854 until his death.

He was elected to one further term in the North Carolina Senate between 1859 and 1861. He was a delegate to the Charleston Democratic National Convention in 1860 and the North Carolina Constitutional Convention of 1861.

During the American Civil War, Ashe was a major in the Confederate Army, in charge of all transportation between Virginia and the rest of the South. Ashe was killed in a railroad accident near Wilmington, North Carolina on September 14, 1862. He is buried in a family cemetery in Pender County, North Carolina.

References

External links

Sources

1813 births
1862 deaths
Ashe family
Democratic Party North Carolina state senators
People of North Carolina in the American Civil War
Railway accident deaths in the United States
Accidental deaths in North Carolina
Democratic Party members of the United States House of Representatives from North Carolina
Confederate States Army officers
19th-century American politicians